The  Landshut Residence (German:Stadtresidenz Landshut) is a palace in Landshut, Lower Bavaria.

History
In 1536 Louis X, Duke of Bavaria laid the foundation stone for a new residence in the inner city of Landshut. It was begun in German Renaissance style under the architect Bernhard Zwitzel from Augsburg; this palace is today known as the "German building" (in German: Deutscher Bau). During a journey to Italy the duke got the inspiration for an additional palace.

Behind the German building, close to the river Isar, the so-called "Italian building" (in German: Italienischer Bau) was constructed from 1537 to 1543  in Italian Renaissance style with a spacious courtyard and the palace chapel. It was  modeled in particular after the Palazzo Te in Mantua, and was the first Italian style palace  erected north of the Alps. Both buildings were connected by two wings. The paintings in the rooms were created by the Germans Hermanus Posthumus, Hans Bocksberger the Elder and Ludwig Refinger, while the stucco was done by Italian artists.

When Count  William of Birkenfeld-Gelnhausen, who became later the first Duke in Bavaria, resided in the palace from 1780 onwards the facade of the German building was altered in French Neo-classical style by Carl Albert von Lespilliez and the so-called "Birkenfeld Rooms" were constructed. These rooms were decorated again with early wallpaper, when Crown Prince Ludwig lived here in the early 19th century, in the course of  his studies in Landshut. These rooms are today a part of the Residence Museum, together with the halls of the Italian building.

References

External links

  Landshut Residence

Houses completed in 1543
Palaces in Bavaria
Royal residences in Bavaria
Museums in Bavaria
Renaissance architecture in Germany
Historic house museums in Germany
Registered historic buildings and monuments in Bavaria
Buildings and structures in Landshut
1543 establishments in the Holy Roman Empire